The Slovenia men's national 3x3 team is the 3x3 basketball team representing Slovenia in international men's competitions, organized and run by the Slovenian Basketball Federation.

Senior Competitions

World Cup

Europe Championships

References

External links
Official website

3
Men's national 3x3 basketball teams